Andrea Coppolino (born 19 August 1979) is an Italian male artistic gymnast, representing his nation at international competitions. He participated at the 2008 Summer Olympics in Beijing, China. He also competed at world championships, including the 1999 World Artistic Gymnastics Championships, 2001 World Artistic Gymnastics Championships, 2002 World Artistic Gymnastics Championships, 2003 World Artistic Gymnastics Championships, 2005 World Artistic Gymnastics Championships, 2006 World Artistic Gymnastics Championships and 2007 World Artistic Gymnastics Championships.

References

1979 births
Living people
Italian male artistic gymnasts
Place of birth missing (living people)
Gymnasts at the 2008 Summer Olympics
Olympic gymnasts of Italy
European champions in gymnastics
Mediterranean Games silver medalists for Italy
Mediterranean Games medalists in gymnastics
Competitors at the 2001 Mediterranean Games